Josepha Sherman (December 12, 1946 – August 23, 2012) was an American author, folklorist, and anthologist. In 1990 she won the Compton Crook Award for the novel The Shining Falcon.

Works

Series

Buffyverse
Visitors (1999) (with Laura Anne Gilman)
Deep Water (2000) (with Laura Anne Gilman)

Find Your Fate Junior Transformers
9. The Invisibility Factor (1986)

Bardic Choices (with Mercedes Lackey)
1. A Cast of Corbies (1994)

Prince of the Sidhe
1. The Shattered Oath (1995)
2. Forging the Runes (1996)

Novels
Golden Girl and the Crystal of Doom (1986)
The Shining Falcon (1989) -- based on the Russian fairy tale The Feather of Finist the Falcon
The Horse of Flame (1990)
Child of Faerie, Child of Earth (1992)
A Strange and Ancient Name (1992)
Windleaf (1993)
Gleaming Bright (1994)
King's Son, Magic's Son (1994) -- based on the Child ballad King Estmere
Son of Darkness (1998)

Series contributed to
Secret of the Unicorn Queen
Swept Away! (1988)
The Dark Gods (1989)
Swept Away / Sun Blind (2004) (with Gwen Hansen)

Bard's Tale
1. Castle of Deception (1992) (with Mercedes Lackey)
4. The Chaos Gate (1994)

Star Trek (with Susan Shwartz)
Vulcan's Forge (1997)
Vulcan's Heart (1999)
Exodus: Vulcan's Soul Book One (2004)
Exiles: Vulcan's Soul Trilogy Book Two (2006)
Epiphany: Vulcan's Soul Trilogy Book Three (2007)

Highlander
Highlander: The Captive Soul (1998)

Mage Knight
4. The Black Thorn Gambit (2004)

Gene Roddenberry's Andromeda
4. Through the Looking Glass (2005)

Anthologies edited
A Sampler of Jewish-American Folklore (1992)
Rachel the Clever: And Other Jewish Folktales (1993)
Orphans of the Night (1995)
In Celebration of Lammas Night (1995)
Trickster Tales: Forty Folk Stories from Around the World (1996)
Lammas Night (1996) (with Mercedes Lackey)
Urban Nightmares (1997) (with Keith R.A. DeCandido)
Merlin's Kin: World Tales of the Heroic Magician (1998)
Told Tales: Nine Folktales from Around the World (1999)
Magic Hoofbeats: Fabulous Horse Tales (2004)
Young Warriors: Stories Of Strength (2005) (with Tamora Pierce)

Non fiction
Indian Tribes of North America (1986)
Greasy Grimy Gopher Guts: The Subversive Folklore of Childhood (1995) (with T K F Weisskopf)
The First Americans: Spirit of the Land and the People (1996)
Xena: All I Need to Know I Learned from the Warrior Princess (1998)
Artificial Intelligence (2000) (with Robert L Perry)
Build Your Own Website (2000) (with Robert L Perry)
Multimedia Magic (2000) (with Robert L Perry)
Personal Computer Communications (2000) (with Robert L Perry)
Bill Gates: Computer King (2000)
Barrel Racing (2000)Bull Riding'(2000)
Jeff Bezos: King of Amazon (2001)
Larry Ellison: Sheer Nerve (2001) (with Daniel Ehrenhaft)
The Ear: Learning How We Hear (2001)
The Upper Limbs: Learning about How We Use Our Arms, Elbows, Forearms, and Hands (2001)
Samuel de Champlain: Explorer of the Great Lakes Region and Founder of Quebec (2002)
Henry Hudson: English Explorer of the Northwest Passage (2002)
Mythology for Storytellers (2002)
Competitive Soccer for Girls (2002)
Deep Space Observation Satellites (2003)
The History of the Internet (2003)
The History of the Personal Computer (2003)
Internet Safety (2003)
Flakes and Flurries: A Book about Snow (2003)
Gusts and Gales: A Book about Wind (2003)
Nature's Fireworks: A Book about Lightning (2003)
Splish Splash!: A Book about Rain (2003)
Sunshine: A Book about Sunlight (2003)
Shapes in the Sky: A Book about Clouds (2003)
The Cold War (2003)
Your Travel Guide to Ancient China (2003)
Your Travel Guide to Ancient Israel (2003)
Geothermal Power (2003)
Hydroelectric Power (2003)
Nuclear Power (2003)
Solar Power (2003)
Wind Power (2003)
It's a Www. World (2004)
Fossil Fuel Power (2004)
Queen Lydia Liliuokalani, Last Ruler of Hawaii (2004)

Anthologies contribution
First Contact (1987)
Dragon Fantastic (1992)
Alternate Warriors (1993)
Alien Pregnant by Elvis (1994)
Weird Tales from Shakespeare (1994
Witch Fantastic (1994)
Xanadu 3 (1994)
Chicks in Chainmail (1995)
Sherlock Holmes in Orbit (1995)
Superheroes (1995)
Don't Forget Your Spacesuit, Dear (1996)
Future Net (1996)
Otherwere (1996)
The Shimmering Door (1996)
Space Opera (1996)
Elf Magic (1997)
Return of the Dinosaurs (1997)
Wizard Fantastic (1997)
Zodiac Fantastic (1997)
Black Cats and Broken Mirrors (1998)
Chicks 'n Chained Males (1999)
Children of the Night (1999)
Flights of Fantasy (1999)
Twice Upon a Time (1999)
Civil War Fantastic (2000)
Guardsmen of Tomorrow (2000)
Perchance to Dream (2000)
The First Heroes: New Tales of the Bronze Age (2004)
Magic Tails (2005)
Sword and Sorceress XXIV (2009)

Short stories
The Magic-stealer (1991)   
Monsieur Verne and the Martian Invasion (1993) (collected in Mike Resnick's alternate history anthology Alternate Warriors)   
Ancient Magics, Ancient Hope (1994)   
The Defender of Central Park (1994)   
Racehorse Predicts the Future! (1994)   
The Case of the Purloined L'Isitek (1995)   
Old Woman Who Created Life (1995)   
Teacher's Pet (1995)
Witch-Horse (1995)  
The Coyote Virus (1996)   
I've Got the Horse, Right Here (1996)   
Mother Knows Best (1996)   
One Late Night, with Jackal (1996)   
A Song of Strange Revenge (1996)   
Fangs for the Memory (1997)   
A Game of Mehen (1997)   
Ilian (1997)   
Netted (1997)   
Wild Hope (1997)   
The Cat Who Wasn't Black (1998)   
Feeding Frenzy Or the Further Adventures of the Frog Prince (1999)   
A Question of Faith (1999)   
Shiftless (1999)   
The Dreams That Stuff Is Made of (2000)   
Images (2000)   
The Silver Flame (2000)   
"A Hero for the Gods" (2004)
Cat-Friend (2005)
The Case Of The Haunted City (2009)

Television
The Adventures of the Galaxy Rangers (1986)

References

External links

1946 births
2012 deaths
American fantasy writers
20th-century American novelists
21st-century American novelists
20th-century American women writers
21st-century American women writers
Women science fiction and fantasy writers
American folklorists
Women folklorists
American women novelists
Women anthologists
People from East Haven, Connecticut